Monotone refers to a sound, for example music or speech, that has a single unvaried tone. See: monophony.

Monotone or monotonicity may also refer to:

In economics
Monotone preferences, a property of a consumer's preference ordering.
Monotonicity (mechanism design), a property of a social choice function.
Monotonicity criterion, a property of a voting system.
Resource monotonicity, a property of resource allocation rules and bargaining systems.

In mathematics
Monotone class theorem, in measure theory
Monotone convergence theorem, in mathematics
Monotone polygon, a property of a geometric object
Monotonic function, a property of a mathematical function
Monotonicity of entailment, a property of some logical systems
Monotonically increasing, a property of number sequence

Other uses
Monotone (software), an open source revision control system
Monotonic orthography, simplified spelling of modern Greek 
The Monotones, 1950s American rock and roll band
Quantifier monotonicity, in formal semantics